The Willis–Campbell Act of 1921 was a piece of legislation in the United States intended to clarify and tighten regulations around the medicinal use of alcohol during Prohibition. The law, sponsored by Republican Sen. Frank B. Willis of Ohio and Rep. Philip P. Campbell of Kansas, specified that only "spirituous and vinous liquors" (i.e. spirits and wine, thus excluding beer) could be prescribed medicinally, reduced the maximum amount of alcohol per prescription to half a pint, and limited doctors to 100 prescriptions for alcohol per 90-day period. It was commonly known as the "beer emergency bill".

The Act kept in force all anti-liquor tax laws that had been in place prior to the passage of the Volstead Act in 1919, giving authorities the right to choose whether or not to prosecute offenders under prohibition laws or revenue laws, but at the same time guaranteeing bootleggers that they would not be prosecuted in both ways.

References

External links
 
 

1921 in law
1921 in the United States
67th United States Congress
Prohibition in the United States
United States federal controlled substances legislation
United States federal criminal legislation